Mehelkuna  is a village development committee in Surkhet District in the Bheri Zone of mid-western Nepal. At the time of the 1991 Nepal census it had a population of 7649 people living in 1404 individual households. Pavitra Bazzar is the largest town in this VDC. There are two Higher Secondary Schools.

References

External links
UN map of the municipalities of Surkhet District

Populated places in Surkhet District